Nila Masterani is an Odia feature film  released in 1996. This film was produced by Rabi Ratha and written by Godabarisha Mohapatera and Chakradhar Sahu. This comic was also directed by Chakradhar Sahu.

Meenaketan Das and Priyanka Mahapatra have acted in different roles in this feature film.

Cast 

 Minaketan Das
 Priyanka Mahapatra

Songs and music 
In this film, music is directed by Malay Mishra.

Awards 
In 1997 this film was awarded with 5 state awards. Special Jury Award, Best Script, Best recording, Best story & Best Acting.

References

External links 
 

1996 films
1990s Odia-language films